The International Journal of Trichology is a biannual peer-reviewed open access medical journal published by Medknow Publications on behalf of the Hair Research Society of India. The journal publishes articles on the subject of trichology including forensic trichology. The editor-in-chief is Patrick Yesudian.

Abstracting and indexing
The journal is abstracted and indexed in Scopus, EBSCO databases, and Expanded Academic ASAP.

External links
Official Website

Dermatology journals
Open access journals
Biannual journals
English-language journals
Medknow Publications academic journals
Publications established in 2009
Trichology
Academic journals associated with learned and professional societies